Bordertown is a Finnish crime drama and Nordic noir television series created by Miikko Oikkonen and starring Ville Virtanen as detective inspector Kari Sorjonen. The first season, which consisted of eleven episodes, premiered in Finland on 16 October 2016 on Yle TV1. Season two, containing ten episodes, premiered on 7 October 2018, and season three, containing another ten episodes, premiered in December 2019.

In addition to its home country, the series has received praise internationally; fans of the series include American author Stephen King, Hollywood actress Gwyneth Paltrow, and Monty Python star Eric Idle.

Overview

Detective inspector Kari Sorjonen is one of the most respected officers at the National Bureau of Investigation (NBI) in Finland when his wife barely survives brain cancer. Sorjonen is a high-functioning autistic and exhibits traits related to savantism. The character is based on British writer Daniel Tammet and also resembles an 'everyman'-type Sherlock Holmes.

Sorjonen takes a new job, initially leading SECRI, the Serious Crime Unit, in the city of Lappeenranta, South Karelia, Finland. He moves his family to the town near the border with Russia for a more peaceful life. Things turn out to be less than calm there, however.  Interwoven with casework from SECRI, Sorjonen attempts to be a devoted husband to a wife recovering from a health scare, as well as a devoted father to a daughter. His work often takes precedence over family concerns, something his wife and daughter wrestle with throughout the series. Although singularly focused on his investigations, Sorjonen clearly has a closeness not only with his family but also with the other team members of SECRI, especially Niko, Lena, and H. P.

Cast and characters

Main

 Ville Virtanen as Detective Inspector Kari Sorjonen
 Matleena Kuusniemi as Pauliina Sorjonen
 Anu Sinisalo as Detective Constable Lena Jaakkola
  as Katia Jaakkola
 Kristiina Halttu as Detective Superintendent Taina Perttula
  as Janina Sorjonen
 Ilkka Villi as Detective Constable Niko Uusitalo

Recurring

 Max Bremer as Coroner Hannu-Pekka Lund
 Matti Laine as Risto Susi-Huhtala
 Jasmin Hamid as Jenna "Jänis" Luhta
 Janne Virtanen as Robert Degerman
 Mikko Leppilampi as Mikael Ahola
 Laura Malmivaara as Anneli Ahola
 Niina Nurminen as Johanna Metso
 Elias Salonen as Elias Ström
 Eriikka Väliahde as Satu-Maria Porttila
 Svante Martin as Gösta Liljeqvist
 Satu Paavola as Veera Niemi
 Maria Kuusiluoma as Jaana Erkki 
 Johan Storgård as Tuomas Heikkinen
 Robert Enckell as Paul Degerman

Episodes

Season 1 (2016)

Season 2 (2018)

Season 3 (2019–2020)

Development and production
Bordertown is produced for Yle by Fisher King Production and Federation Entertainment. The series was presented at the MIPTV Media Market in Cannes on 3 April 2016, where it competed in the MIPDrama Screenings for the "Coup de Cœur" award.

International distribution rights were acquired from Federation Entertainment in October 2016 by Sky Deutschland for Germany, CanalPlay for France, and VRT for Flanders (Dutch-speaking Belgium). The series was sold to "over 40 countries".

Bordertown was renewed for a second season on 25 April 2017, with Kuusniemi, Sinisalo, Susi, Ainali, and Villi also reprising their roles. Filming began in Lappeenranta on 8 August 2017 and wrapped in Helsinki on 7 November 2017.

The series was renewed for a third season in September 2018, with filming starting on 13 December 2018. The season premiered in December 2019, and it has been labelled as the final one.

Release

Broadcast
Bordertown premiered on Yle TV1 on 16 October 2016. The debut was watched by 1.1 million viewers and set a record for a Finnish series. Total viewership for season one was an average of one million viewers.

Season two premiered on 7 October 2018 (it was originally scheduled to premiere on 14 October).

Season three premiered on 1 December 2019.

Home media
Netflix acquired rights in February 2017 to stream the series in the United States, Canada, the United Kingdom, Norway, Sweden, Denmark, Ireland, Iceland, Eastern Europe, Russia, and the Netherlands. Streaming of season one became available on 31 March 2017, followed by season two on 2 February 2019, and season three on 11 May 2020.

Season one was released on DVD and Blu-ray in Germany by EuroVideo on 14 February 2019, followed by season two on 11 April 2019.

Awards and nominations
Bordertown won the 2017 Golden Venla Awards for Best Drama Series, Best Actor (Ville Virtanen), and Best Actress (Anu Sinisalo).

Continuation
, a film based on the series, premiered in the autumn of 2021 and featured the characters from the television series. The film, an independent work, was produced by Fisher King Oy. International distribution is also planned. Netflix acquired rights on 1 December 2021.

See also 
 Lakeside Murders

References

External links
 
 
 

2016 Finnish television series debuts
2010s crime television series
Finnish drama television series
2010s Finnish television series
Yle original programming
Finnish police procedural television series
Laestadianism in popular culture